was a Japanese voice actor. Yamanouchi died on April 7, 2003, due to complications from lung cancer.

Filmography

Television dramas
Akō Rōshi (1964) (Uesugi Tsunanori)
Tokugawa Ieyasu (1983) (Ikoma Chikamasa)

Television animation
Future Boy Conan (1978) (Grandpa, Dr. Lao)
Lupin III Part 2 (1979) (Napoleon the Eleventh)
Vision of Escaflowne (1996) (Dornkirk)
Silent Mobius (1998) (Kōhō Yamigumo)

Theatrical animation
Wanpaku Ōji no Orochi Taiji (1963) (Wadatsumi, Kushinada-Hime's father)
Cyborg 009 (1966) (Black Ghost)
Catnapped! (1995) (Master Sandada)
Ghost in the Shell (1995) (Foreign Minister)

Original video animation (OVA)
Armored Trooper Votoms: Shining Heresy (1994) (Viacheslav da Montewells)

Dubbing roles

Film
Montgomery Clift
 Red River (Matthew "Matt" Garth)
 From Here to Eternity (TV edition) (Private Robert E. Lee "Prew" Prewitt)
 Terminal Station (TV edition) (Giovanni Doria)
 Raintree County (John Wickliff Shawnessey)
 Suddenly, Last Summer (Dr. Cukrowicz)
 Judgment at Nuremberg (TV edition) (Rudolph Peterson)
 The Misfits (1966 TV Asashi edition) (Perce Howland)
 Freud: The Secret Passion (Sigmund Freud)
 The Defector (Prof. James Bower)
Tyrone Power
 Suez (Ferdinand de Lesseps)
 The Mark of Zorro (Don Diego Vega/Zorro)
 Blood and Sand (Juan Gallardo)
 Crash Dive (Lt. Ward Stewart)
 The Long Gray Line (Martin Maher)
 Untamed (Paul van Riebeck)
 The Eddy Duchin Story (Eddy Duchin)
 Witness for the Prosecution (Leonard Vole)
 12 Angry Men (1974 NTV edition) (Juror #6 (Edward Binns))
 12 Angry Men (Juror #3 (George C. Scott))
 Amistad (John Quincy Adams (Anthony Hopkins))
 Braveheart (1999 TV Asahi edition) (Edward "Longshanks" I (Patrick McGoohan))
 Cold Sweat (1979 NTV edition) (Katanga (Jean Topart))
 The Day the Earth Stood Still (Tom Stevens (Hugh Marlowe))
 Dead Again (Franklyn Madson (Derek Jacobi))
 The Exorcist III (Father Dyer (Ed Flanders))
 The Godfather (1976 NTV edition) (Johnny Fontane (Al Martino))
 Meet Joe Black (William Parrish (Anthony Hopkins))
 Roman Holiday (1972 Fuji TV edition) (Irving Radovich (Eddie Albert))
 The Running Man (1990 TV Asahi edition) (Damon Killian (Richard Dawson))
 The Sting (FBI Agent Polk (Dana Elcar))
 Terminator 2: Judgment Day (Dr. Peter Silberman (Earl Boen))

Television
 The X-Files (The Smoking Man (William B. Davis))

References

External links

1929 births
2003 deaths
Deaths from lung cancer in Japan
Japanese male voice actors